The Donaulied ("Danube song") is a German song (Lied) that, in most versions, describes the rape of a young woman sleeping on the bank of the Danube. It is frequently sung at festivities as a drinking song.

Texts 
The text of the Donaulied is the account of a man who walks along the bank of the Danube, where he finds a young woman sleeping. Depending on the version, he rapes her or he has consensual sex with her as she wakes up.

The earliest known text of the Donaulied was dated to 1850 by Johann Lewalter, who attributed it to the village of Guntershausen. This version went:

A longer version published by Tobias Krummschnabel in 1870 portrays the sex as consensual. Many other versions of the text exist, some of which are very sexually explicit; these versions may date to the First World War. Most portray the encounter as a rape, especially those published prior to 2012. In that year, the Schlager music singer Mickie Krause released an album of party songs including a consensual version of the Donaulied.

One of the cruder versions of the Donaulied, made available in 2020 by the German student Corinna Schütz as part of a petition against sexual violence in songs, has the encounter end like this, after the woman complains that her rapist has made her pregnant and that she can't afford any more children:

Reception in Germany 
The Donaulied has been sung "for generations" during festivities in Germany, and is reproduced in song text collections of the Oktoberfest and other beer festivals. It is part of a tradition of sexually explicit drinking songs in Germany, most of which have long been considered insignificant and were not covered by scholars of popular music, except for a brief period of interest in the 1920s.

In May 2020, the Donaulied became the subject of public debate in Germany as the Passau student Corinna Schütz launched an online petition against "beer tent sexism". The petition asked people to stop singing the song because it normalized and glorified sexual violence against women. By 2 June, more than 23,000 people had signed the petition, but Schütz also received death threats and other hate-filled messages in response to her petition.

References 

German folk songs
Drinking songs
Sexual violence